Open Cam is a 2005 American comedy-drama film directed by Robert Gaston, starring Andreau Thomas and Amir Darvish. It was released on DVD the following year by Wolfe Video.

Cast
 Andreau Thomas as Manny Yates
 Amir Darvish as Hamilton
 Ben Green as Maurice
 Matt Cannon as Conrad
 Christian Jones as Chris
 Reiner Prochaska as Pierce
 John Geoffrion as Bill
 Ryan Thrasher as Trevor
 Vincent Bradberry as John

Reception
Dennis Harvey of Variety wrote that the film is "heavier on sex appeal than suspense" and conveys "little sense of place".

Phil Hall of Film Threat wrote that the film "isn't thrilling", the "wildly untalented" cast has "no clue how respond to the parameters of a crime drama", and Gaston is "unable to disguise the poverty of the production". Bay Windows Brian Jewell criticized the film for its lack of consistency. Jewell also praised Darvish's performance amid the otherwise weak cast.

References

External links
 
 

American comedy-drama films
2005 comedy-drama films
2005 LGBT-related films
American LGBT-related films
LGBT-related comedy-drama films